Qul may refer to:
Qul (Turkic)
Qul, Tajikistan
North Bolivian Quechua (ISO 639-3: qul)